Candy Idoko (born 27 September 1985) is a Nigerian former professional tennis player.

Born in Kaduna, Idoko played for the Nigeria Davis Cup team between 2007 and 2010, registering wins in four doubles rubbers. Early in his career he secured funding from a sponsor in the Netherlands which allowed him to tour internationally. He won two ITF Futures titles in doubles while competing on the professional tour. In 2011 he won a doubles silver medal and singles bronze medal at the 2011 All-Africa Games in Maputo.

Idoko's younger brother Emmanuel was also a tennis player.

ITF Futures finals

Doubles: 4 (1–3)

References

External links
 
 
 

1985 births
Living people
Nigerian male tennis players
Sportspeople from Kaduna
African Games silver medalists for Nigeria
African Games bronze medalists for Nigeria
African Games medalists in tennis
Competitors at the 2011 All-Africa Games